Frederick Maurice may refer to:

 Frederick Maurice (British Army officer, born 1841) (1841–1912), English general, son of the theologian
 Frederick Maurice (British Army officer, born 1871) (1871–1951), English general, son of the general born in 1841
 Frederick Denison Maurice (1805–1872), English theologian

See also
 Fred Morris (disambiguation)